The seventh and final season of the television series Buffy the Vampire Slayer premiered on September 24, 2002 on UPN and concluded its 22-episode run on May 20, 2003. It maintained its previous timeslot, airing Tuesdays at 8:00 pm ET.

Plot 
Season seven deals with the Potential Slayers, normal girls around the world who are candidates to succeed the Slayer upon her death.

It is revealed that Buffy's resurrection caused an instability which allows The First Evil, a spiritual entity that Buffy encountered in the third season, to begin tipping the balance between good and evil. It has inactive Potential Slayers hunted and killed by Caleb, a sinister and misogynistic preacher turned serial killer, who heads a cult called Bringers, who worship The First as a god. Inside the Hellmouth it raises an army of Turok-Han, an ancient and powerful sub species of vampire. Caleb later destroys the Watchers' Council's headquarters in London, killing many Watchers, including Quentin Travers.

Dawn begins her sophomore year at high school. Buffy gets a job at the rebuilt Sunnydale High, where she meets the new principal, Robin Wood, a vampire hunter and the son of deceased Slayer, Nikki Wood, who was killed by Spike in New York City many years ago. Buffy also reunites with Willow, who still is working through her emotional rampage in the previous season, and Spike, who earned his soul back but is temporarily driven mad by regret. 

Willow begins to heal emotionally from Tara's death and finds solace with a Potential Slayer named Kennedy. They immediately start dating before Kennedy can fully understand Willow. Their relationship is strained when Willow drains a significant portion of her life force to reopen a portal for Buffy, but they soon reconcile. 

Andrew Wells and Jonathan Levinson leave Mexico and return to Sunnydale after The First convinces Andrew to help open the Seal of Danzalthar, which results in the death of Jonathan. Andrew is captured by the Scoobies, who show resentment toward him, but he becomes a committed ally after The First takes Jonathan's form and tries to convince him to kill all the Potentials in the house. Andrew refuses, insisting he's good now, later admitting his guilt about how cruel his betrayal of Jonathan was and disclosing that he does not believe he will survive the forthcoming battle.

Anya and Xander break up for good after a demon named Halfrek gets her to kill a group of frat boys. Buffy and Anya fight while Willow summons D'Hoffryn, who questions Anya. Anya requests that her latest vengeance be reversed. Halfrek is killed and Anya is turned human once more.

Spike is driven mad by The First, and soon it also gains control of him for a time. The First also reveals that Spike killed Robin Wood's mother, sparking a vendetta. Robin makes an attempt on Spike's life. Ironically, this attack frees Spike from his insanity and, regaining his clarity, Spike beats Robin. Buffy finds the injured Robin in his garage and angrily shuns him for attacking Spike. Buffy finds out that Giles was part of the scheme, and becomes angry at him, but they soon make peace.

Willow helps track the Potentials in Sunnydale and a number of them, brought by Giles, take refuge in Buffy's house. Dawn at first believes herself to be a Potential, but becomes disappointed when she finds that is not the case. Xander cheers her up saying she's anything but ordinary. The now human Anya also returns to the Scooby Gang, and while she and Xander still love each other, they don't get back together. 

Later, a fully reformed Faith, having been broken out of prison by Wesley to save Angel, returns to Sunnydale to help fight The First. During Faith's return, the Scoobies and the Potentials begin to question Buffy's leadership skills. Everything goes seemingly well, but when Buffy leads the Potentials to attack Caleb and the Bringers, several girls are killed and Xander loses an eye during the fight. The Scoobies and the Potentials eventually mutiny against her, electing a reluctant Faith as their new leader. Spike, however, stays loyal to Buffy and informs her that he has learned of an ancient weapon, known as the Scythe, that was designed only for the Slayer. While Buffy fights Caleb and finds the Scythe, Faith leads the Potentials on a mission in the sewers, only to find they've been tricked as a time bomb explodes. Following the explosion, several Turok-Han attack the survivors. Buffy saves the lives of the remaining Potentials, reconciles with her friends and finally makes peace with Faith. 

As the Hellmouth becomes more active, nearly all humans and supernatural creatures flee Sunnydale, turning the town into a ghost town. Buffy and her friends stay behind in an effort to defeat The First. Meanwhile, Xander, at Buffy's request, takes Dawn out of Sunnydale to safety. Also, Principal Wood returns to join the cause and finally accepts Spike.

In the series finale, Dawn adamantly returns to help fight against the First. As she does so, Angel leaves Los Angeles and returns to Sunnydale with an amulet (given to him by Wolfram & Hart), which Buffy gives to Spike. Buffy finally kills Caleb by cutting him in half with the scythe. While Caleb is dead, they make their move to thwart The First's plans once and for all. The Potentials descend into the Hellmouth to fight an army of Turok-Han, while the other Scoobies hold off the few Turok-Han that escape into the halls of Sunnydale High. Willow uses a spell that activates all the Potential Slayers, granting them some Slayer powers. Anya is killed in the fight, along with some of the new Slayers. Fearing she is done for, The First returns to taunt Buffy, saying her fight is in vain. Refusing to let the world be destroyed, Buffy and her allies dig deep and begin to gain the upper hand. Spike's amulet channels the power of the sun and kills all of the Turok-Han in the Hellmouth, but Spike himself is also consumed and he sacrifices himself to defeat the enemy. Buffy tells Spike she loves him; he tells her to run. The Hellmouth collapses, and the resulting crater swallows all of Sunnydale. The survivors of the battle escape on a school bus, which Buffy catches up to after saying goodbye to Spike.

In the last scene of the series, the survivors gather on the rim of Sunnydale's crater. The Scoobies and new Slayers tend to the wounded. Xander mourns Anya's death and is consoled by Andrew. Dawn asks what their next move is and Buffy smiles.

Cast and characters

Main cast 
 Sarah Michelle Gellar as Buffy Summers/The First Evil
 Nicholas Brendon as Xander Harris
 Emma Caulfield as Anya Jenkins
 Michelle Trachtenberg as Dawn Summers
 James Marsters as Spike/The First Evil
 Alyson Hannigan as Willow Rosenberg

Recurring cast

Guest cast 
 Elizabeth Anne Allen as Amy Madison
 Sharon Ferguson as First Slayer
 George Hertzberg as The First Evil/Adam
 Clare Kramer as The First Evil/Glory
 Mark Metcalf as The First Evil/The Master
 Andy Umberger as D'Hoffryn
 Harris Yulin as Quentin Travers

Crew 
Series creator Joss Whedon served as executive producer, and wrote two episodes – the season premiere and finale – and directed the finale as well. Marti Noxon also served as executive producer and was the showrunner, but only co-wrote one episode. Noxon was originally due to write the penultimate episode of the series, but she was already busy writing a new pilot for Fox. Jane Espenson was promoted to co-executive producer and wrote or co-wrote six episodes. Co-executive producer David Fury wrote three episodes, including directing one of them. Supervising producer Douglas Petrie was promoted to co-executive producer midseason and wrote or co-wrote four episodes, including directing one of them. Rebecca Rand Kirshner was promoted to executive story editor and wrote three episodes. Drew Z. Greenberg was promoted to story editor and wrote three episodes. The only new addition was Drew Goddard, who wrote or co-wrote five episodes.

David Solomon directed the most episodes in the seventh season, directing five episodes and was promoted to co-executive producer. James A. Contner (also co-producer) directed three.

Episodes

Crossovers with Angel 
The seventh and final season of Buffy the Vampire Slayer coincided with the fourth season of Angel. This was the final year in which both shows were on television together.

In "Lies My Parents Told Me", Willow (Alyson Hannigan) receives a call from Fred. She leaves immediately and goes to L.A. without telling why. Willow appears in the Angel episode "Orpheus" to re-ensoul Angel (David Boreanaz) as she previously did before in "Becoming". After successfully re-ensouling Angel, she brings Faith (Eliza Dushku) back with her to Sunnydale to help in the fight against The First Evil.

In the Angel season four finale, "Home", Angel receives an amulet from Wolfram & Hart which is important to the final battle in Sunnydale. Angel goes to Sunnydale in the penultimate episode "End of Days" and also appears in the series finale "Chosen". Angel gives Buffy the amulet (which is later worn by Spike in the final battle) and offers his help, but Buffy declines as she needs him to be the second front if they fail. Buffy and Angel share one final moment in a graveyard where they discuss a possible future.

In the fifth and final season of Angel, Spike is resurrected (after his death in "Chosen") by the magical amulet. Spike becomes a main character in the final season. Harmony Kendall (Mercedes McNab) also becomes a main character in the final season. Buffy recurring character Andrew Wells (Tom Lenk) appears in two episodes ("Damage" and "The Girl in Question") in the final season of Angel, revealed to be a Watcher-in-training. Andrew states in "Damage" that Xander is in Africa, Willow and Kennedy are in Brazil, Buffy and Dawn are in Rome, and everyone else is in England.

Reception 
The series received a Primetime Emmy Award nomination for Outstanding Special Visual Effects for a Series for "Chosen". While, "Chosen" won for Outstanding Visual Effects in a Television Series at the Visual Effects Society Awards.

"Conversations with Dead People" won a Hugo Award for Best Dramatic Presentation – Short Form, while "Chosen" was nominated in the same category.

The series received the Television Critics Association Heritage Award.

The Futon Critic named "Conversations with Dead People" the 42nd best episode of 2002 and "Chosen" the 50th best episode of 2003.

The seventh season averaged 4.1 million viewers. Rotten Tomatoes gave season seven a score of 80% with an average rating of 8.33 out of 10 based on 20 reviews with a critics consensus stating, "Seldom subtle, always subversive, Buffy ends the way it began: a funny, weird show that packs a punch and a whole lot of feeling."

Canonical comic book continuation 
In late 2006, series creator Joss Whedon announced that a canonical comic book continuation of the series would be written. The comic book, titled Buffy the Vampire Slayer Season Eight, is published by Dark Horse Comics; and the first issue (written by Whedon), titled "The Long Way Home" was released on March 14, 2007.

The storyline picks up after the end of the final episode with the Scooby Gang in Europe and Buffy in charge of all the new Slayers. Most of the characters from the television series appear in the comic book series.

Out of the 40 issues of Season Eight, Whedon wrote 17 issues and oversaw all other issues as "executive producer". Other Buffy television writers that have written issues include Jane Espenson (6 issues), Drew Goddard (4 issues), Steven S. DeKnight (1 issue), Drew Z. Greenberg (1 issue) and Doug Petrie (1 issue).

The comic book series continued with Buffy the Vampire Slayer Season Nine in September 2011, Buffy the Vampire Slayer Season Ten in March 2014, Buffy the Vampire Slayer Season Eleven in November 2016, and concluded with Buffy the Vampire Slayer Season Twelve in June 2018.

A graphic novel (canon status not certain) set during the seventh season of the show, Spike: Into the Light, written by James Marsters, was released by Dark Horse Comics on July 16, 2014.

DVD release 
Buffy the Vampire Slayer: The Complete Seventh Season was released on DVD in region 1 on November 16, 2004 and in region 2 on April 5, 2004. The DVD includes all 22 episodes on 6 discs presented in full frame 1.33:1 aspect ratio (region 1) and in anamorphic widescreen 1.78:1 aspect ratio (region 2 and 4). Special features on the DVD include seven commentary tracks—"Lessons" by writer Joss Whedon and director David Solomon; "Conversations with Dead People" by writers Jane Espenson and Drew Goddard, director Nick Marck, and actors Danny Strong and Tom Lenk; "Selfless" by writer Drew Goddard and director David Solomon; "The Killer in Me" by writer Drew Z. Greenberg and director David Solomon; "Lies My Parents Told Me" by co-writer/director David Fury, co-writer Drew Goddard, and actors James Marsters and D. B. Woodside; "Dirty Girls" by writer Drew Goddard and actor Nicholas Brendon; and "Chosen" by writer and director Joss Whedon. Featurettes include, "Buffy: It's Always Been About the Fans", which details the fandom of the series; "Buffy 101: Studying the Slayer" showcases interviews with television critics and scholars discussing the themes of show; "Generation S" showcases interviews with the "Slayerettes" introduced in the season; "The Last Sundown" has Joss Whedon list his favorite episodes and comments on the show; "Buffy wraps" features interviews with cast and crew at the series wrap party; and "Season 7 Overview – Buffy: Full Circle", a 30-minute featurette where cast and crew members discuss the season. Also included are series outtakes and DVD-ROM content.

References

External links 
 
 List of Buffy the Vampire Slayer season 7 episodes at BuffyGuide.com
 

 
2002 American television seasons
2003 American television seasons